Between 1910 and 1912, the Smithsonian Institution in collaboration with the Field Museum of Chicago and the University of Chicago undertook a comprehensive biological survey of Panama prior to the completion of the Panama Canal.

Participants included Edward Alphonso Goldman of the Bureau of Biological Survey; Seth Eugene Meek of the Field Museum of Natural History and Samuel F. Hildebrand who collected reptiles, amphibians and fishes; Eugene Amandus Schwarz and August Busck of the Agriculture Department’s Bureau of Entomology who focused on insects; plants were collected by Henri Pittier and Albert Spear Hitchcock of the Agriculture Department’s Bureau of Plant Industry and William Ralph Maxon from the United States National Museum.

References

Science and technology in Panama